Zhongshan Junior High School station (formerly transliterated as Chungshan Junior High School Station until 2003) is a station on Brown Line of the Taipei Metro, located on the border between the Zhongshan and Songshan districts in Taipei, Taiwan. It is named after the Zhongshan Junior High School.

Station overview

The three-level, elevated and has two side platforms located at level 3, together with the connecting level at level 4. It has four exits, and is connected to a nearby office building. Prior to the opening of the Neihu section, it served as the northern terminal station for Brown Line. The concourse level with ticket machines are at level 2.

Station layout

Exits
Exit 1: Near the intersection of Minquan E. Rd. Sec. 3 and Fuxing N. Rd.

Around the station
 Rongxing Garden Park
 Taipei Fish Market

References

1996 establishments in Taiwan
Railway stations opened in 1996
Wenhu line stations